Tertiary is an obsolete term for the geologic period from 66 million to 2.6 million years ago. 
The period began with the demise of the non-avian dinosaurs in the Cretaceous–Paleogene extinction event, at the start of the Cenozoic Era, and extended to the beginning of the Quaternary glaciation at the end of the Pliocene Epoch. The time span covered by the Tertiary has no exact equivalent in the current geologic time system, but it is essentially the merged Paleogene and Neogene periods, which are informally called the Early Tertiary and the Late Tertiary, respectively. The Tertiary established the Antarctic as an icy island continent.

Historical use of the term
The term Tertiary was first used by Giovanni Arduino during the mid-18th century. He classified geologic time into primitive (or primary), secondary, and tertiary periods based on observations of geology in Northern Italy. Later a fourth period, the Quaternary, was applied.

In the early development of the study of geology, the periods were thought by scriptural geologists to correspond to the Biblical narrative, the rocks of the Tertiary being thought to be associated with the Great Flood.

In 1833, Charles Lyell incorporated a Tertiary Period into his own, far more detailed system of classification, based on fossil mollusks he collected in Italy and Sicily in 1828-1829. He subdivided the Tertiary Period into four epochs according to the percentage of fossil mollusks resembling modern species found in those strata. He used Greek names: Eocene, Miocene, Older Pliocene, and Newer Pliocene.

Although these divisions seemed adequate for the region to which the designations were originally applied (parts of the Alps and plains of Italy), when the same system was later extended to other parts of Europe and to America, it proved to be inapplicable. Therefore, the use of mollusks was abandoned from the definition and the epochs were renamed and redefined.

For much of the time during which the term 'Tertiary' was in formal use, it referred to the span of time between 65 and 1.8 million years ago. The end date of the Cretaceous and the start date of the Quaternary were subsequently redefined at c. 66 and 2.6 million years ago respectively.

Modern equivalents
The Tertiary period lies between the Mesozoic Era and the Quaternary Period, although it is no longer recognized as a formal unit by the International Commission on Stratigraphy.

The span of the Tertiary is subdivided into the Paleocene (66–56 million years BP), the Eocene (56–33.9 million years BP), the Oligocene (33–23.9 million years BP), the Miocene (23–5.3 million years BP) and the Pliocene (5.3–2.6 million years BP), extending to the first stage of the Pleistocene, the Gelasian Stage.

References

External links

 

Cenozoic